The 2011 Food City 250 was the 25th stock car race of the 2011 NASCAR Nationwide Series. It was held on August 26, 2011, at Bristol Motor Speedway, in Bristol, Tennessee, before a crowd of 108,000 spectators. Kyle Busch of the Joe Gibbs Racing team won the 250-lap race from the pole position. His teammate Joey Logano finished in second, and Kevin Harvick Incorporated driver Clint Bowyer was third.

Busch won the pole position by posting the fastest lap in qualifying, and held the lead for the opening 112 laps until he was passed by Bowyer on the 113th lap. Busch retook the lead at the start on the 163th lap. He maintained the first position for the next 24 laps, with Bowyer retaking the lead on lap 187. Two laps later, Busch overtook Bowyer to reclaim the lead. Logano was the leader at the final restart on lap 198. On the 206th lap, Busch got ahead of his teammate Logano to advance back into first. Over the final 34 laps, Logano tried to get by his teammate Busch, but he was unsuccessful, as Busch held him off to win by 0.019 seconds, the closest finish in a Nationwide Series race at Bristol Motor Speedway.

The win was Busch's third consecutive at Bristol Motor Speedway (the first time in Nationwide Series history), his 12th at the track, and the 50th of his career in the division, breaking Mark Martin's record of most series wins he held since 1997. Ricky Stenhouse Jr. maintained the lead in the Drivers' Championship, with Elliott Sadler reducing his advantage to five points. Joe Gibbs's  18 team increased their advantage over the No. 60 team of Jack Roush at the top of the Owners' Championship, while Toyota moved past Ford to lead the Manufacturers' Championship with nine races left in the season.

Background

The 2011 Food City 250 was the 25th of 34 scheduled stock car races of the 2011 NASCAR Nationwide Series. It was held on August 26, 2011, in Bristol, Tennessee, at Bristol Motor Speedway, a short track that holds NASCAR races. The standard track is a four-turn  short oval. The track's turns are banked from 24 to 30 degrees, while both the front stretch (the location of the finish line) and the back stretch is banked from six to ten degrees.

Before the race Ricky Stenhouse Jr. led the Drivers' Championship with 834 points, with Elliott Sadler eight points behind in the second position. Reed Sorenson was in third with 825 points, Justin Allgaier was fourth with 772 points and Aric Almirola stood in fifth on 770 points. Jason Leffler, Kenny Wallace, Steve Wallace, Brian Scott and Michael Annett rounded out the top ten. Joe Gibbs, owner of the  18 car, led the Owners' Championship with 912 points. Jack Roush's No. 60 team followed in second with 870 points, while Sandra Turner's No. 32, DeLana Harvick's No. 33, and Roush's No. 6 team completed the top five. Ford led the Manufacturers' Championship with 142 points; Toyota, Chevrolet, and Dodge followed with 141, 134, and 110 points, respectively. Kyle Busch was the race's defending champion.

There was one driver change heading into the race. Penske Racing announced that Camping World Truck Series driver Parker Kligerman would drive the  22 car in place of Brad Keselowski who was recovering from an ankle fracture and a strained back that he sustained in a testing crash at Road Atlanta in early August 2011. It was later disclosed that Penske driver Kurt Busch declined an offer to fill in for Keselowski because he wanted to focus on challenging for the Sprint Cup Series championship.

Practice and qualification

One 120 minute practice session was held on the morning of August 26. With a time of 16.02 seconds, Sadler was the fastest driver in the sole practice session, ahead of Kenny Wallace in second, and Trevor Bayne in third. Leffler was fourth-fastest, Busch came fifth, and Joey Logano placed sixth. Carl Edwards was seventh-quickest, Steve Wallace eighth, Mike Bliss ninth, and Kasey Kahne tenth. During practice, T. J. Bell accidentally reversed on the pit road, and ran over the pelvis of his team's crew chief Cory Howe, who sustained a cut to his head. Howe was conscious when he was airlifted to Wellmont Health System in Kingsport, Tennessee for treatment to his injuries. Tests for any severe injuries to Howe were negative.

A total of 49 cars attempted to qualify for the event on Friday afternoon; according to NASCAR's qualifying procedure forty-three were allowed to race. Each driver ran two laps, with the starting order determined by the competitor's fastest lap times. Busch took his second Nationwide Series pole position at Bristol Motor Speedway, and the 23rd of his career, with a lap of 15.979 seconds. He was joined on the grid's front row by Logano, his Joe Gibbs Racing teammate, who recorded a time that was 0.018 seconds slower. Sadler qualified in the third position, Kenny Wallace took fourth, and Leffer started from fifth place. Edwards, Bayne, Allgaier, Clint Bowyer, and Stenhouse completed the top ten qualifiers. Johnny Chapman, John Jackson, J. J. Yeley, Bell, Jennifer Jo Cobb, and Carl Long were the six drivers who failed to qualify.

Qualifying results

Race
Live television coverage began at 7:30 p.m. Eastern Daylight Time (UTC−04:00) in the United States on ESPN. Around the start of the race, rain fell on the track, but it later dissipated. Mike Rife, senior minister of Vansant Church of Christ, began pre-race ceremonies with an invocation. Country music singer JT Hodges performed the national anthem, and Sullivan County Deputy Sheriff Carolyn Gudger commanded the drivers to start their engines. No driver moved to the back of the grid during the pace laps.

The race began at 7:46 p.m. local time. Busch maintained the lead from his teammate Logano on the first lap. On lap four, Bowyer attempted to get between two Roush Fenway Racing cars, and ran into the rear of Stenhouse's car exiting turn four. By the ninth lap, Logano was 1.3 seconds adrift of race leader Busch. Sadler began battling Kenny Wallace for third on lap 13, and got ahead of him seven laps later. The first caution was waved on lap 35, as David Reutimann was hit from behind by Kahne, sending him spinning in the fourth turn, and reducing Busch's lead of more than 2.6 seconds to nothing. During the caution, several drivers chose to make pit stops. Busch led at the lap 42 restart, followed by Logano, Bowyer, and Sadler. Around this time, Sadler advanced to second place but Logano retook it on the 47th lap.

By lap 68, Busch moved to around 1.2 seconds ahead of his teammate Logano. Three laps later, Bowyer passed Logano on the inside lane between the third and fourth turns to move into second place. He began closing the gap to Busch while the two were within slower traffic. Bowyer clung onto the rear of Busch on lap 110, and he made a pass for the lead between turns three and four on the 113th lap. Busch then began reporting a tight handling car. On lap 122, Bowyer eased off the accelerator pedal to avoid hitting Sorenson and David Starr in turn four. As the surface of the circuit caused drivers to have difficulties with steering their vehicles, on lap 125, Jeremy Clements' tire failed, grazing the catchfence, and littering debris on the track, necessitating the second caution. Busch made a pit stop under caution on the 127th lap. Bowyer maintained the lead at the lap 132 restart. Four laps later, Kenny Wallace caused a third caution when his tire failed, and he made contact with the barrier between turns three and four.

The race restarted on lap 141 with Bowyer leading Busch and his teammate Logano. Sadler sought a way past Busch on the 143rd lap but he could not complete the overtake. A fourth caution came out on lap 145, as Kligerman spun 180 degrees up the circuit in turn two while attempting to pass Stenhouse. Bowyer again maintained the first position at the lap 151 restart. That lap, Bayne unsuccessfully attempted to overtake Busch for second. Bayne later fell behind Leffler and Edwards to fourth on the 160th lap. Busch went to the outside to pass Bowyer to retake the lead at the start/finish line to start lap 163. Five laps later, Edwards began battling Leffler for the third position, and the trio of Bayne, Sadler and Almirola were in a duel for sixth place by lap 173. By the 178th lap, Busch and Bowyer pulled away to lead the third-placed Leffler by five seconds.

On lap 185, Bowyer went to the inside of Busch, and passed him for the lead two laps later. He led the next two laps before Busch passed him on lap 189. Two laps later, Starr's tire blew, and the right-hand quarter of his car struck the turn two wall, triggering the fifth (and final) caution. All of the leaders (including Busch) elected to make pit stops during the caution. Green flag racing resumed on the 198th lap with the non-stopping Logano leading. That lap, Busch began challenging his teammate Logano for the lead. Edwards lost fourth to Bowyer on lap 201. Five laps later, Bowyer overtook Leffler for third place. Around the same time, Logano lost the lead to Busch. On the 211th lap, Logano made an unsuccessful attempt to retake the lead from his teammate Busch, as the first three were evenly separated by lap 220.

By the 239th lap, Busch had increased his lead to eight-tenths of a second, though his teammate Logano lowered it to challenge him six laps later. Both were delayed by Joe Nemechek on lap 247 but the two got past him soon after. Busch and Logano were alongside each other during the final two laps, as Busch had an understeer at the right-rear of his car when he steered to the inside. Logano took the lead on the inside, and moved narrowly ahead of Busch leaving the fourth turn. However, Busch had momentum on the outside down the frontstretch to win. It was Busch's third consecutive win at Bristol Motor Speedway (a first in series history), his 12th at the track, and the 50th in the Nationwide Series, breaking Mark Martin's 1997 record of most division victories. The margin of victory was 0.019 seconds, the closest in a Nationwide Series race at Bristol Motor Speedway, and then the seventh closest in NASCAR history since electronic scoring was introduced in 1993. There were six lead changes among three drivers during the race. Busch's 186 laps led was the most of any competitor.

Post-race

Busch appeared in Victory Lane after his victory lap to celebrate his 50th career victory in front of the crowd of 108,000 people; the win earned him $46,575. He said that he was pleased to break Martin's achievement at Bristol Motor Speedway, and felt he was certain the spectators enjoyed his battle with Logano, "There are an awful lot of accomplishments and it's hard to pinpoint where they fall, but tonight is a pretty big one, just being able to race that hard and race against a teammate like that knowing that he had just as good of stuff as I did." Logano stated he was envious about his teammate's win, "I did everything I could possibly do besides wreck him to try to make the pass. But that ain't the right thing to do when he's your teammate. It's frustrating, but what a day for JGR. Coming across the line that close and rubbing doors. That's cool. I just wish that I was the one celebrating right now."

Third-placed Bowyer complemented Busch, "I'm fortunate to be able to work with him every weekend. Just listening to the way he talks about his car and what he looks for, there definitely are a lot of things you can learn from talking to him and watching him race. We want to beat him. It's frustrating to be so close. He's just a really good driver." Busch's crew chief Jason Ratcliff commented that the driver had the potential to win 100 Nationwide Series races, "The first time I met Kyle when he was running the 5 car at Hendrick; he was very, very impressive from the first time I watched him on the race track and had to race against him, So I was really excited when he came over to Gibbs." Edwards, who finished in fourth place, spoke of his disappointment over not winning the event after he was penalized for a pit road transgression, "Man, I really wanted to win this race, We got pushed back with the pit road penalty and that made the night tougher. Then we got all the way back up there and I thought we were going to have a shot there at the end."

The result kept Stenhouse in the lead of the Drivers' Championship with a new total of 867 points. Sadler moved to within five points of him in second, and Sorenson was another five points behind in third. Almirola improved his position to fourth, while Allgaier fell to fifth. Leffler, Kenny Wallace, Steve Wallace, Scott, and Annetti rounded out the top ten. Gibbs' No. 18 team also maintained the lead in a much wider Owners' Championship; Edwards' fourth-place finish left Roush's No. 60 team 50 points behind Gibbs, while Turner's No. 32, Harvick's No. 33, and Roush No. 6 squads remained third, fourth, and fifth. Toyota gained the lead in the Manufacturers' Championship with 150 points; Ford, Chevrolet, and Dodge followed with 146, 140, and 114 respective points.

Race results

Standings after the race

Note: Only the top ten and five positions are included for the driver and owner standings respectively.

References

2011 in NASCAR
Food City 250
NASCAR races at Bristol Motor Speedway